This is a list of Arizona Wildcats baseball seasons. The Arizona Wildcats baseball program is a college baseball team that represents the University of Arizona in the Pac-12 Conference in the National Collegiate Athletic Association. The Wildcats have played their home games at Hi Corbett Field in Tucson, Arizona since 2012. Prior to that, the Wildcats played their home games at Jerry Kindall Field at Frank Sancet Stadium from 1967-2011 and UA Field from 1929-1966.

The Wildcats are regarded as one of the most successful programs in college baseball history, having won 4 College World Series championships - tied for 4th most all-time. They have appeared in the College World Series 18 times - tied for 7th most all-time - and have made the NCAA Tournament 41 times - 6th most all-time. They have been the National Runner-Up 4 times.

Season Results

Notes 

Sources:

References 

 
Arizona Wildcats
Arizona Wildcats baseball seasons